Simone Chrisostome (10 December 1923 – 1 January 2021) was a French Resistance member. She fought for the organization and survived the German concentration camps Ravensbrück and Fünfeichen.

References

1923 births
2021 deaths
French Resistance members
Ravensbrück concentration camp survivors